Katoria is a community development block in Banka district, Bihar, India. It is one of the part of 11 blocks that make up the Banka district. It is part of Banka Lok Sabha constituency along with other assembly constituencies; namely, Amarpur, Banka, Belhar and Dhoraiya. Katoria Block is bounded by Chandan Block towards South, Belhar Block towards North, Banka Block towards East, Sangrampur Block towards North. Banka, Deoghar, Jhajha, Amarpur are the nearby markets to Katoria. Katoria consists of 223 Villages and 16 Panchayats.  Jamua is the smallest Village and Katoria is the biggest Village. It is at an elevation (altitude) of 247 m.

The nearest large city to Katoria is Kolkata in west Bengal, and Patna in Bihar.

Radhanagar is a village near to Katoria. Radhanagar is situated 4 km from the main market of Katoria.

Jaipur is a Village in Katoria Block in Banka District of Bihar State, India. It belongs to Bhagalpur Division . It is located 33 KM towards South from District head quarters Banka. 222 KM from State capital Patna 

Jaipur Pin code is 813106 and postal head office is Katoria . 

Jaipur is surrounded by Chandan Block towards South , Mohanpur Block towards South , Deoghar Block towards South , Belhar Block towards North . 

Deoghar , Banka , Jhajha , Amarpur are the near by Cities to Jaipur.

	Jaipur
From Baidyanath Dham Deoghar to Jaipur can be reached by Bus Auto or Taxi. In the way of Deoghar Hansdiha road, to take left from Jaipur More just after Mohanpur. About 8 k.m. distance is from jaipur More and 25 l.m. from Baidyanath Dham. Jaipur is known as the village of Jagdish Prasad Sah. Jagdish Prasad Sah was a renowned Mahajan of Bhagalpur Division and Santhal Pargana Division. He was the richest person of Banka District. He was the Mukhiya (head) of the Jaipur panchayat for 25 consecutive years. The present four Panchayats were then part of Jaipur Panchayat. He had a one-sided rule in the Jaipur Panchayat (present four panchayat). He was Zamindar (landlord) of Eastern Katoria. His mansion was known for a lot of robberies and raids.

Language 
Angika is the local language in Katoria. People also speak Hindi and Santhali. The total population of Katoria Block is 146,613, living in 23,777 houses spread across a total of 223 villages and 16 panchayats. Males are 76,328 and Females are 70,285

Weather and Climate of Katoria Block 
In summer, the highest day temperature in Katoria is in between 29 °C to 44 °C .

Average monthly temperatures: January 16 °C, February 20 °C, March 27 °C, April 32 °C, May 35 °C.

How to reach Katoria Block

By Road 
There are frequent buses which arrive regularly from Deoghar, Jasidih, Banka, Bhagalpur and Sultanganj. It is approximately 35 km from Deoghar. One can also hire a private auto rickshaw or car.

By Rail 
The railway station is approximately 1.5 km from the centre. A local train leaves daily between Jasidih/Deoghar and Banka. Jaisidih is on the main line and is well connected to all big cities. All major trains stop here, including Rajdhani and Shatabdi Express.

References

Banka district